Pseudopaludicola is a genus of leptodactylid frogs from lowland northern and central South America. They are known under the common name dwarf swamp frogs or swamp frogs.

Systematics
The synapomorphy defining this genus is the greatly enlarged tubercle on the outer edge of the forearm (i.e., hypertrophied antebrachial tubercle). Genetic analyses have recovered this genus as monophyletic, in accordance with earlier studies using morphological characters. Genetic data suggest four major clades within the genus.

Species
Following the Amphibian Species of the World, there are currently 25 species in this genus:

AmphibiaWeb also lists Pseudopaludicola serrana, whereas the Amphibian Species of the World considers it synonym of Pseudopaludicola murundu.

References

 
Leptodactylidae
Amphibians of South America
Amphibian genera
Taxa named by Alípio de Miranda-Ribeiro